Luke Holmes (born 14 November 1983 in Mona Vale, Australia) is a rugby union footballer. His regular playing position is hooker. He represented the Rebels in the 2012 Super Rugby season having formerly played for the Western Force.

He has been named in the Waratahs Playing Squad for the 2013 Super Rugby season.

References

External links
Waratahs profile 
itsrugby.co.uk profile

Living people
1983 births
Australian rugby union players
Rugby union hookers
Western Force players
Melbourne Rebels players
New South Wales Waratahs players
Sportsmen from New South Wales
ACT Brumbies players
Sydney (NRC team) players
Rugby union players from Sydney
Perth Spirit players